Joseon missions to Imperial China were Joseon diplomatic ventures which were intermittently sent in the years 1392–1894. These represent a significant aspect of the international relations of mutual Korean-Chinese contacts and communication.

Joseon diplomacy
A series diplomatic ventures illustrate the persistence of Joseon's sadae (serving the great) diplomacy in dealings with China. The chronology of one side in a bilateral relationship stands on its own.

This long-term, strategic policy contrasts with the gyorin (kyorin) (neighborly relations) diplomacy in dealings with Jurchen, Japan, Ryukyu Kingdom, Siam and Java. Gyorin was applied to a multi-national foreign policy. The unique nature of these bilateral diplomatic exchanges evolved from a conceptual framework developed by the Chinese.  Gradually, the theoretical models would be modified, mirroring the evolution of a unique relationship.

Envoys to the Ming court
Although the Joseon Dynasty considered 1392 as the foundation of the Joseon kingdom, Imperial China did not immediately acknowledge the new government on the Korean peninsula.  In 1401, the Ming court recognized Joseon as a tributary state in its sino-centric schema of foreign relations.  In 1403, the Yongle Emperor conveyed a patent and a gold seal to  Taejong of Joseon, thus confirming his status and that of his dynasty.

Despite the label "tributary state", China did not interfere in Joseon domestic affairs and diplomacy.  Between 1392 and 1450, the Joseon court sent 351 missions to China.
 

 1592 – Confronting Japanese invasion, Joseon sought aid from China.
 1597 – Yi Su-gwang was the Joseon chief envoy from the Joseon court.

Envoys to the Qing court
In this period, Joseon merchants of Gaeseong and Hanyang competed for profits; and they even accompanied the envoy missions to China in their search for new opportunities for financial gain.

 1795 – The first and only American to be received in the court of the Qianlong Emperor took special note of the reception of Joseon ambassadors, who were received immediately preceding the Dutch embassy in which Andreas Everardus van Braam Houckgeest had a role.
 1872 – Park Gyu-su was the Joseon chief envoy to the court of the Tongzhi Emperor, offering congratulations.

Korean Empire

In 1897, the Chinese and Korean Empire agreed that the latter would established a permanent embassy in Beijing. The Korean legation was short-lived and only existed from 1903 to 1905, when it was terminated by effect of the Japan–Korea Treaty of 1905.

See also 
 Goryeo missions to Imperial China
 Goryeo missions to Japan
 Joseon diplomacy
 Joseon missions to Japan
 Joseon tongsinsa

Notes

References
 Daehwan, Noh.  "The Eclectic Development of Neo-Confucianism and Statecraft from the 18th to the 19th Century," Korea Journal (Winter 2003).  
 Kang, Etsuko Hae-jin. (1997). Diplomacy and Ideology in Japanese-Korean Relations: from the Fifteenth to the Eighteenth Century. Basingstoke, Hampshire; Macmillan. ; 
 Kang, Jae-eun and Suzanne Lee. (2006). The Land of Scholars : Two Thousand Years of Korean Confucianism. Paramus, New Jersey: Homa & Sekey Books. ; OCLC 60931394
 Kim, Chun-gil. (2005).  The history of Korea. Westport, Connecticut: Greenwood Publishing Group.  	; ; 
 Toby, Ronald P. (1991).  State and Diplomacy in Early Modern Japan: Asia in the Development of the Tokugawa Bakufu. Stanford: Stanford University Press. 
 vanBraam Houckgeest, André Everard. (1798).  An authentic account of the embassy of the Dutch East-India company, to the court of the emperor of China, in the years 1794 and 1795, Vol. I. London : R. Phillips.

Foreign relations of the Joseon dynasty
Foreign relations of the Qing dynasty
Foreign relations of the Ming dynasty
China–Korea relations